Sadiya Umar Farouq (born 5 November 1974), is a Nigerian politician and the current Minister of Humanitarian Affairs, Disaster Management and Social Development.

Appointed by President Muhammadu Buhari in July 2019, Farouq is by age the youngest minister in the current federal cabinet. She served as Federal Commissioner of the National Commission for Refugee, Migrants and Internally Displaced Persons (NCFRMI) from October 2016 to August 2019.

Her work with President Buhari dates back to Buhari's days as the leader and presidential candidate of the defunct Congress for Progressive Change when Farouq was the national treasurer of CPC and later national treasurer of the All Progressives Congress.

Background
Saadiya Umar Farouk born on 5th, November 1974 in Zurmi, Local Government Area of Zamfara State. She attended Federal Government Girls College Gusau, Zamfara State and later proceed to Ahmadu Bello University, Zaria where she graduated with a BSc in Business Administration in 1998 and also successfully completed her master's degree MSc in same University in international Affairs and Diplomacy in 2008 and another master's in Business Administration MBA in 2009.

Early Career 
Saadiya Umar Farouk underwent her one year mandatory service year at the National Assembly, where she was also employed as an administrator at the National Assembly service Commission as an administrative officer 2 in 2003 where she rose to the position of principal administrator officer. From 1999 to 2000 Saadiya Umar Farouk served under the Senate committee on Aviation and works will the Senate committee on Appropriation. She also worked as the operation manager at the Pinnacle Travel Tours Ltd a Nigerian travel agency between 2001 to 2003.

Political Career 
Saadiya Umar Farouk resigned from the National Assembly Commission to officially join politics as a member of the defunct Congress for progressive Change (CPC) where she rose to became the National treasurer of the CPC with dissolved into a new Party. All Progressive Congress (APC) , Saadiya Umar Farouk became the interim National treasurer of the APC from 2013 to 2014. She was appointed as a member of the All Progressive Congress (APC) Presidential campaign Council where she served as the director of election planning and monitoring. Field operations, and fundraising, in preparation for the 2015 general election which Buhari as the presidential candidate of APC won.

Political Appointment
On September 26, 2016 Saadiya Umar Farouk was appointed as the Honourable Federal Commissioner of the national Commission for refugees migrants and internally displaced person ( NCFRMI). In August, 21 2019 Saadiya Umar Farouk was appointed as the minister of Humanitarian Affairs, Disaster management, president move the National social investment (N- SIP) to the office of minister of humanitarian affairs, disaster management.

Major Achievement In Office
Saadiya Umar Farouk has several achievement since the creation of the ministry of humanitarian affairs and disaster management in August 2019 , it is on record that at least 20 million Nigerians have so far been empowered through various social investment Programmes and initiatives of the ministry. It is also on record that under the National Home Grown School Feeding Programme, a total of 9.9 million children from primary 1 to 3 in public schools nationwide are currently being feed one hot Nutrition, 126,000 benefiting cooks for in the ( NHGSFP).In the area of the youth empowerment and upliftment, the ministry has been able to upskill about 1,664,774 youths in the graduate and nongraduated Programmes under the N-power scheme. In early July 2022 the Saadiya Umar Farouk flagged of the cash grant for vulnerable group in Oshogbo, Osun State. As Honourable minister she provides Leadership in the development of humanitarian policies and the effective coordination of National and international humanitarian intervention: ensure strategic disaster mitigation, preparedness and response and managed the formulation and implementation of fair focused social inclusion and protection Programmes in Nigeria in line with the ministry. Before her appointment as a minister Saadiya Umar Farouk has a track record as the honourable federal commissioner of the national Commission for refugees, migrants and internally displaced person (NCFRMI) . She drew up a new strategic roadmap of action to reposition the Commission to take the leading role as Nigeria's humanitarian organisation and bring the Commission activities to world standard. The new strategic roadmap of the Commission focused on the total provision of durable solution to person of concern while emphasizing the establishment of standardised procedures for utilizing research, data gathering and planning for resetting, rehabilitating, reintegrating, and readmitting all persons that full within the Commission.Her office has been working hand-in-hand National Commission for Persons with Disabilities, headed by Mr. James Lalu, to ensure inclusiveness of the more than 30 million disabied people in matters affecting the country and its people. Hence she commissioned the National Disability Electronic Certificate Production Centre located at the Persons With Diasbility Complex in Abuja.

Award And Recognition
 Africa's leading woman in Humanitarian Service Award 
 Nigeria Excellence Award in Public Service.
 National Humanitarian response to covid-19 Award.
 Merit Award from Yusuf Maitama Sule University.
 Dususu Gender Minister Award.
 Daily Trust African Award.
 Award of Excellence from Kano University.

References

External links
https://www.fmhds.gov.ng
https://nassp.gov.ng/hon-minister-sadia-umar-farouq/
https://fmic.gov.ng/fg-inaugurates-humanitarian-policy-dialogues-forum/
https://www.vanguardngr.com/2020/09/minister-inaugurates-27-man-national-humanitarian-coordinating-cmtee/
https://leadership.ng/fg-inaugurates-humanitarian-national-technical-committee-for-cisec-framework/

Living people
Ahmadu Bello University alumni
All Progressives Congress politicians
People from Zamfara State
1974 births
Nigerian women in politics
Buhari administration personnel